The Departments (Northern Ireland) Order 1999 set out new devolved Northern Ireland government departments and the Northern Ireland Executive.

Departments created
The Departments (NI) Order 1999 created the following departments:
 Office of the First Minister and deputy First Minister
 Department of Agriculture and Rural Development
 Department of Culture, Arts and Leisure
 Department of Education
 Department of Enterprise, Trade and Investment
 Department of the Environment
 Department of Finance and Personnel
 Department of Health, Social Services and Public Safety
 Department of Higher and Further Education, Training and Employment (now called the Department for Employment and Learning)
 Department for Regional Development
 Department for Social Development

References

External links
  
 Northern Ireland Executive

Government of Northern Ireland